The Curious Case of Benjamin Button may refer to:

 "The Curious Case of Benjamin Button" (short story)
 The Curious Case of Benjamin Button (film)
 The Curious Case of Benjamin Button (musical)